Sadewa     is a village development committee in the Himalayas of Taplejung District in the Province No. 1 of north-eastern Nepal. At the time of the 2011 Nepal census it had a population of 1,048 people living in 211 individual households. There were 515 males and 533 females at the time of census.

References

1. High school
2. Heath post
3. Post Office

External links
UN map of the municipalities of Taplejung District

Populated places in Taplejung District